The 1946 Chicago White Sox season was the White Sox's 46th season in the major leagues, and their 47th season overall. They finished with a record of 74–80, good enough for 5th place in the American League, 30 games behind the first place Boston Red Sox.

Offseason 
 December 8, 1945: Tony Cuccinello was released by the White Sox.

Regular season

Season standings

Record vs. opponents

Opening Day lineup 
 Wally Moses, RF
 Floyd Baker, 3B
 Taffy Wright, LF
 Luke Appling, SS
 Hal Trosky, 1B
 Don Kolloway, 2B
 Thurman Tucker, CF
 Mike Tresh, C
 Bill Dietrich, P

Notable transactions 
 July 4, 1946: Tom Jordan was traded by the White Sox to the Cleveland Indians for a player to be named later. The Indians completed the deal by sending Frankie Hayes to the White Sox on July 15, 1946.
 July 23, 1946: Wally Moses was purchased from the White Sox by the Boston Red Sox.

Roster

Player stats

Batting 
Note: G = Games played; AB = At bats; R = Runs scored; H = Hits; 2B = Doubles; 3B = Triples; HR = Home runs; RBI = Runs batted in; BB = Base on balls; SO = Strikeouts; AVG = Batting average; SB = Stolen bases

Pitching 
Note: W = Wins; L = Losses; ERA = Earned run average; G = Games pitched; GS = Games started; SV = Saves; IP = Innings pitched; H = Hits allowed; R = Runs allowed; ER = Earned runs allowed; HR = Home runs allowed; BB = Walks allowed; K = Strikeouts

Farm system 

LEAGUE CHAMPIONS: New River

References

External links 
 1946 Chicago White Sox at Baseball Reference

Chicago White Sox seasons
Chicago White Sox season
Chicago White